Haynes Table is a high, snow-covered mesa, some  across and rising to , located south of Mount Odishaw in the Hughes Range, of Antarctica, between the heads of Keltie Glacier and Brandau Glacier. It was discovered and photographed by U.S. Navy Squadron VX-6 on the flight of January 12–13, 1956, and was named by the Advisory Committee on Antarctic Names for B.C. Haynes, a meteorologist of the U.S. Weather Bureau on U.S. Navy Operation Highjump 1946–47.

References

Mesas of Antarctica
Landforms of the Ross Dependency
Dufek Coast